The common moorhen (Gallinula chloropus), also known as the waterhen or swamp chicken, is a bird species in the rail family (Rallidae). It is distributed across many parts of the Old World.

The common moorhen lives around well-vegetated marshes, ponds, canals and other wetlands. The species is not found in the polar regions or many tropical rainforests. Elsewhere it is likely the most common rail species, except for the Eurasian coot in some regions.

The closely related common gallinule of the New World has been recognized as a separate species by most authorities, starting with the American Ornithologists' Union and the International Ornithological Committee in 2011.

Name
The name mor-hen has been recorded in English since the 13th century. The word moor here is an old sense meaning marsh; the species is not usually found in moorland. An older name, common waterhen, is more descriptive of the bird's habitat.

A "watercock" is not a male "waterhen" but the rail species Gallicrex cinerea, not closely related to the common moorhen. "Water rail" usually refers to Rallus aquaticus, again not closely related.

The scientific name Gallinula chloropus comes from the Latin Gallinula (a small hen or chicken) and the Greek chloropus (khloros χλωρός green or yellow, pous πούς foot).

Description

The moorhen is a distinctive species, with predominantly black and brown plumage, with the exception of a white under-tail, white streaks on the flanks, yellow legs and a red frontal shield. The bill is red with a yellow tip. The young are browner and lack the red shield. The frontal shield of the adult has a rounded top and fairly parallel sides; the tailward margin of the red unfeathered area is a smooth waving line. In the related common gallinule (Gallinula galeata) of the Americas, the frontal shield has a fairly straight top and is less wide towards the bill, giving a marked indentation to the back margin of the red area.

The common moorhen gives a wide range of gargling calls and will emit loud hisses when threatened.

Habitat
This is a common breeding bird in marsh environments,  well-vegetated lakes and even in city parks.  Populations in areas where the waters freeze, such as eastern Europe, will migrate to more temperate climates. In China, common moorhen populations are largely resident south of the Yangtze River, whilst northern populations migrate in the winter, therefore these populations show high genetic diversity.

Behaviour

Diet and feeding
This species will consume a wide variety of vegetable material and small aquatic creatures. They forage beside or in the water, sometimes walking on lilypads or upending in the water to feed. They are often secretive, but can become tame in some areas. Despite loss of habitat in parts of its range, the common moorhen remains plentiful and widespread.

Breeding
The birds are territorial during breeding season, and will fight with other members of their species, as well as other water birds such as ducks, to drive them out of their territory. The nest is a basket built on the ground in dense vegetation. Laying starts in spring, between mid-March and mid-May in Northern hemisphere temperate regions. About 8 eggs are usually laid per female early in the season; a brood later in the year usually has only 5–8 or fewer eggs. Nests may be re-used by different females. Incubation lasts about three weeks. Both parents incubate and feed the young. These fledge after 40–50 days, become independent usually a few weeks thereafter, and may raise their first brood the next spring. When threatened, the young may cling to the parents' body, after which the adult birds fly away to safety, carrying their offspring with them.

Status and population

On a global scale – all subspecies taken together – the common moorhen is as abundant as its vernacular name implies. It is therefore considered a species of Least Concern by the IUCN. However, small populations may be prone to extinction. The population of Palau, belonging to the widespread subspecies G. c. orientalis and locally known as debar (a generic term also used for ducks and meaning roughly "waterfowl"), is very rare, and apparently the birds are hunted by locals. Most of the population on the archipelago occurs on Angaur and Peleliu, while the species is probably already gone from Koror. In the Lake Ngardok wetlands of Babeldaob, a few dozen still occur, but the total number of common moorhens on Palau is about in the same region as the Guam population: fewer than 100 adult birds (usually fewer than 50) have been encountered in any survey.

Other localised groups of common moorhen are starting to come under threat. The Royal Society for the Protection of Birds in the United Kingdom has the common moorhen classified as one of its 103 species whose conservation status is of moderate concern due to its recent population decine. The number of breeding pairs has fallen to its lowest level in the UK since 1966 and has been protected under the Wildlife and Countryside Act (1981).

The common moorhen is one of the birds (the other is the Eurasian coot, Fulica atra) from which the cyclocoelid flatworm parasite Cyclocoelum mutabile was first described. The bird is also parasitised by the moorhen flea, Dasypsyllus gallinulae.

Subspecies

Five subspecies are today considered valid; several more have been described that are now considered junior synonyms. Most are not very readily recognizable, as differences are rather subtle and often clinal. Usually, the location of a sighting is the most reliable indication as to subspecies identification, but the migratory tendencies of this species make identifications based on location not completely reliable. In addition to the extant subspecies listed below, an undescribed form from the Early Pleistocene is recorded from Dursunlu in Turkey.

Life cycle

References

External links

 (Common) Moorhen species text in The Atlas of Southern African Birds
 
 Common Gallinule Species Account – Cornell Lab of Ornithology
 Common Moorhen Information - Gallinula chloropus - USGS Patuxent Bird Identification InfoCenter
 Madeira Birds – Moorhen breeding in Madeira Island
 Ageing and sexing (PDF; 5.7 MB) by Javier Blasco-Zumeta & Gerd-Michael Heinze
 
 
 

common moorhen
common moorhen
Birds of Africa
Birds of Eurasia
Birds of the Canary Islands
Birds of the Gulf of Guinea
Common moorhen
Common moorhen
Articles containing video clips